Reality Bites Back is a reality show hosted by Michael Ian Black that parodies various reality show formats. It premiered July 17, 2008 on Comedy Central. The name is derived from the 1994 film Reality Bites.

Premise 
Ten comedians compete in a variety of contests that spoof popular reality shows. Each week one contestant is eliminated. The winner is then declared the "Lord of All Reality" and receives a $50,000 prize. The show is stated to be about 50% sketch comedy and 50% actual reality.

Contestants 
 Kyle Cease
 Chris Fairbanks
 Jeffrey Garcia
 Red Grant
 Tiffany Haddish
 Bert Kreischer
 Mo Mandel
 Donnell Rawlings
 Amy Schumer
 Theo Von

Standings

 WINNER means the contestant won the competition.
 RUNNER-UP means the contestant came in second over all in the competition.
 WIN means the contestant won the immunity challenge, and was safe from being eliminated.
 LOW means the contestant was eligible for elimination, but survived.
 OUT means the contestant was eliminated
 LEFT means the contestant voluntarily left the show.

Episodes

References

External links 
 Reality Bites Back on Comedy Central
 

2000s American comedy game shows
2000s American parody television series
2000s American reality television series
2008 American television series debuts
2008 American television series endings
Comedy Central original programming
Comedy Central game shows
Reality television series parodies
Television series about television